Yuji Tezuka (born 14 August 1943) is a Japanese former professional tennis player.

Tezuka was active on the tour in the 1970s and appeared in two Davis Cup ties for his country. He won both of his doubles rubbers, as well as his only singles rubber. In 1975 he featured in the main draw of the Wimbledon Championships as a doubles player.

See also
List of Japan Davis Cup team representatives

References

External links
 
 
 

1943 births
Living people
Japanese male tennis players
20th-century Japanese people